Grandville Public Schools is a school district in Grandville, Michigan, United States. The current superintendent is Roger Bearup, who previously served as the assistant superintendent in the Lowell Public Schools Administration.

The district serves almost all of the City of Grandville and sections of Wyoming and the City of Walker.

Attendance area
In Kent County it includes almost all of Grandville, sections of Walker and Wyoming, small parts of Grand Rapids and Byron Township. In Ottawa County it includes portions of Georgetown Township, Jamestown Charter Township, and Tallmadge Township.

Schools

Grandville Public Schools has seven elementary schools: Central, Century Park Learning Center, Cummings, East, Grand View, South, and West.

Grandville Middle School currently serves grades 7 and 8.

Grandville High School enrolls about 1800 students annually in grades 9-12.; its competitive robotics team is housed in its own building, the GHS South Campus Robotics & Engineering Center. High school administration includes Principal Adam Lancto; Assistant Principals Caroline Ernst, Michael Kennedy, and Tung Nguyen; Dean of Students Joel Breazeale; and AD Brian Parsons. They administrate over 1800 students and over 100 staff members.

Academics
Grandville High School offers a wide variety of academic and extracurricular offerings, including 17 Advanced Placement courses, forensics, a competitive engineering and robotics team, jazz band, an award-winning marching band, choir, chamber and concert orchestras, symphony strings, philharmonic orchestra, theater, emergency medical technician certification, and after-school clubs such as photography club and chess club. Its AP Calculus program often receives national attention, with GHS staff training educators at the national level.

Grandville High School was presented with the prestigious Blue Ribbon School Award in 2005–2006, and has had several recipients of AP Scholar and National Merit Recognition Awards. In 2012, the College Board recognized the school with its Advanced Placement District of the Year Awards—Annual Honor Roll.

In 2014, U.S. News & World Report named Grandville High School to the top 3% of schools in Michigan and the top 5% in the nation in its Best High Schools rankings.

The high school uses automatic response clickers in the classrooms. This technology provides instant feedback to teachers to help them find out if the students understand a concept or need further instruction. The responses are anonymous yet provide the necessary feedback.

Every 4th through 12th grader has a Chromebook as part of the one-to-one initiative. Every K-3 student will have access to an iPad in 2014.

Science, Engineering and Robotics Program

Grandville High School is home to the RoboDawgs, a robotics team which since 1998 has been known for its focus on creating student-designed, student-built robots for national and international competitions. In 2013, the team was featured in the evening news because it created parts that were used in a NASA rocket launch. The team captured a regional win in Troy, MI, in 2012 and the Engineering Inspiration Award in 2013.

The team qualified for the world championships in 2014. Out of 9,000 VEX Robotics teams in the world, the RoboDawgs ranked in the top 30 in the world rankings in March 2014.

Grandville Public Schools has been a leader in educational robotics for more than 10 years. Beginning with one high school robotics team in 1998, the district's program has now grown to include more than 30 teams. More than 800 students, from fourth through twelfth grades, participate on Grandville robotics teams, designing, building, and programming robotics for competitions around the world. Grandville has one of largest FIRST LEGO League programs in the country, with the District fielding 18 teams in 2012. These students go on to compete in the District's VEX Robotics program at the middle school level, as well as the FIRST Robotics Competition and the Great American River Race at the high school level. The Grandville Academic Team Boosters provide financial, technical, and coaching support for the Grandville robotics teams and other academic teams in West Michigan.

In addition to robotics, the team has several other science club opportunities, including Science Olympiad and Odyssey of the Mind. The Science Olympiad team placed in the top 20 at the national competition in 2007, and Odyssey of the Mind was the state runner-up in 2009.

Athletics

Grandville Public Schools has 29 varsity teams, ranging from rugby and ice hockey to gymnastics and co-ed bowling.

2013-14 School Year

In fall 2013, the girls cross-country, boys cross-country and boys varsity tennis teams all went to state finals. Tennis coach Tim Buck was named state Coach of the Year in 2013 for Division I Boys Tennis. Soccer coach Dave Saylor was named West Michigan Coach of the Year in November 2013. In winter 2014, the wrestling team was crowned regional champion and Coach Gritter was named State Head Coach of the Year. The competitive cheerleading team was 2014 state runner-up. The boys bowling team earned the regional champ title in winter 2014. The hockey team was regional champ in March 2014 and made it to state quarterfinals. A new hockey scholarship, the Ryan Fischer Memorial Scholarship, was announced in March 2014 to honor the legacy of Grandville co-captain Ryan Fischer. A senior at GHS, Ryan had a 4.0 GPA and was accepted to West Point for fall 2014; he died unexpectedly in his sleep the day of the Final Four hockey game due to an enlarged heart.

In spring 2014, the baseball team was the OK Red champions, and Coach Ricky Clark earned the title of District Coach of the Year. The girls soccer team won districts.

2014-15 School Year

The football team made it to the Division 1 state playoffs, and the boys tennis team also earned passage to the Div. 1 state finals.

2015-16 School Year

In fall 2015, the girls cross country team won the regional championship and competed at state finals.

Anti-Bullying Program

Grandville Public Schools embraces the "be nice" program, a positive anti-bullying approach that goes beyond telling kids not to bully. "Be nice" was developed by the Mental Health Foundation of West Michigan, where Grandville Public Schools Board of Education secretary Christy Buck serves as executive director. "Be nice" has been adopted by many other districts throughout West Michigan.

Early Childhood Education

The district's preschool teachers use the highly endorsed Creative Curriculum. There are a variety of preschool options, as well as Treehouse, the district's daycare program for children from 2.5 to 12 years old.

IMAGE Program for Gifted Learners

The IMAGE (Identified Member of Academically Gifted Education) program is a pull-out program for academically talented students in grades 3-6. Qualification for IMAGE is based on test scores from a nationally normed standardized ability and achievement test. A second grade student must score in the 95 national percentile by age range on the InView ability test or must score with an average math/reading MAP score in the 95 national percentile age range. Once a student has achieved one of those two scores, an identification matrix is used to determine eligibility.

Leadership Initiative

New in 2013, Grandville High School has a leadership program designed to shape the next generation of leaders. Students attend presentations by area leaders to better understand the components of good leadership. School associations, such as the Grandville High School Student Council, Executive Board, and the Student Body Committee all contribute to the school through event planning, service, and fundraising.

Special Education

A full continuum of programs and services is provided to students who require special education intervention. Grandville has a full complement of diagnostic staff personnel in order to conduct individual student evaluation and provide support service to students, teachers, and parents. Parents can get involved with PASE, the Parent Advisory to Special Education group which provides advisory input to support special education services in the county.

Music
Grandville public schools has a large music department. At the high school, this includes seven bands (Four concert bands, one jazz band, one marching band, and one winter winds group.), four orchestras (four concert orchestras), and five choirs. At the middle school, this includes four concert bands (two per grade), four orchestras (two per grade), four choirs (two per grade), and a musical theatre class. 
Instrument classes are offered starting in sixth grade at the elementary schools. Prior to this, lower grades are required to take music classes.

See also

 List of school districts in Michigan

References

External links
 Official website

Grand Rapids metropolitan area
Education in Kent County, Michigan
Education in Ottawa County, Michigan
School districts in Michigan